Shashanka Ghosh is an Indian filmmaker and writer. As a director, his notable works include the commercially successful films like Khoobsurat and Veere Di Wedding. As a writer, he penned the story for Waisa Bhi Hota Hai Part II, he was also the director of the film.

Filmography

Director

Writer
 Waisa Bhi Hota Hai Part II (2003)

Actor

References

External links
 

Living people
Hindi-language film directors
21st-century Indian film directors
Year of birth missing (living people)